KHTO may refer to:

Radio stations
 KHHS, a radio station (104.5 FM) licensed to serve Pearcy, Arkansas, United States, which held the call sign KHTO-FM from 2016 to 2017
 KLXQ, a radio station (96.7 FM) licensed to serve Hot Springs, Arkansas, which held the call sign KHTO from 2009 to 2016
 KZTB, a radio station (97.9 FM) licensed to serve Milton-Freewater, Oregon, United States, which held the call sign KHTO from 2004 to 2006
 KOLW, a radio station (97.5 FM) licensed to serve Basin City, Washington, United States, which held the call sign KHTO in 2004
 KRVI, a radio station (106.7 FM) licensed to serve Mount Vernon, Missouri, United States, which held the call sign KHTO from 1994 to 2003

Airports
 East Hampton Airport, in Wainscott, New York, which formerly held the ICAO callsign KHTO